Sawyer County Airport  is a county-owned public-use airport in Sawyer County, Wisconsin, United States. It is located two nautical miles (4 km) northeast of the central business district of Hayward, Wisconsin. It is included in the Federal Aviation Administration (FAA) National Plan of Integrated Airport Systems for 2021–2025, in which it is categorized as a local general aviation facility. It was formerly known as Hayward Municipal Airport.

Facilities and aircraft 
Sawyer County Airport covers an area of 471 acres (191 ha) at an elevation of 1,216 feet (371 m) above mean sea level. It has two runways: 3/21 is 5,002 by 100 feet (1,525 x 30 m) with an asphalt surface and with approved ILS and GPS approaches; 16/34 is 1,088 by 120 feet (332 x 37 m) with a turf surface.

For the 12-month period ending September 23, 2021, the airport had 11,600 aircraft operations, an average of 32 per day: 82% general aviation, 17% air taxi and 1% military. In January 2023, there were 17 aircraft based at this airport: 14 single-engine, 1 multi-engine and 2 jet.

Hayward (HYR) VOR/DME, 113.4 MHz, is located on the field.

L & L Aviation is the fixed-base operator.

See also 
 List of airports in Wisconsin

References

External links 
 Airport page at Sawyer County website
  at Wisconsin DOT Airport Directory
 

Airports in Wisconsin
Buildings and structures in Sawyer County, Wisconsin